The St. Mark's Cathedral  also called Arica Cathedral is a Catholic church that is located in the city of Arica in the far north of Chile. The building was a commission by the government of the Peruvian President José Balta to the workshops of the Frenchman Gustave Eiffel and originally intended for the Ancón resort.

The old mother church of Arica stood for 226 years, until the colony was destroyed by an earthquake on August 13, 1868. Because of this, a committee of ladies of Arica asked Balta that a new construction be designed for Arica. The request was accepted and the building was inaugurated in 1876 on the ruins of the old mother church.

In 1880, the city of Arica was occupied by the Chilean Army; however, until the early twentieth century, the parish of Arica remained part of the diocese of Arequipa, according to the orders of the Holy See. On February 27, 1910, the mayor of Arica, Maximo Lira, decreed the expulsion of Juan Vitaliano Berroa, parish priest of Arica and his assisting priest Juan Gualberto Guevara, being Peruvian, replacing them with Chilean military chaplains. The jurisdiction of Arica went to the Vicariate General Castrense of Chile and soon after (1911) was annexed to the Vicariate Apostolic of Tarapaca (current Diocese of Iquique).

See also
Roman Catholicism in Chile
Saint Mark's Cathedral (disambiguation)

References

Roman Catholic cathedrals in Chile
Buildings and structures in Arica
Roman Catholic churches completed in 1876
19th-century Roman Catholic church buildings in Chile
Rebuilt buildings and structures in Chile
Gothic Revival church buildings in Chile